The Arthroleptidae  are a family of frogs found in sub-Saharan Africa. This group includes African treefrogs in the genus Leptopelis along with the terrestrial breeding squeakers Arthroleptis, and several genera restricted to the Guinean forests of central and west Africa, such as the hairy frog (Trichobatrachus).

Taxonomy
This family is the phylogenetic sister group of reed frogs, the Hyperoliidae, which together form the lineage Laurentobatrachia, a name that commemorates work on African frogs by the Argentine herpetologist Raymond Laurent. This group is further nested within the Afrobatrachia, an ancient African endemic lineage that includes the Brevicipitidae and Hemisotidae. The Arthroleptidae are separated, based on phylogenetic analyses, into three deeply divergent and dissimilar subfamilies: Arthroleptinae, Astylosterninae, and Leptopelinae. Some consider these to be separate families, while others do not recognize any subfamilies, in particular due to uncertainty in the phylogenetic placement of Leptopelis and Scotobleps.

The three subfamilies consist of these genera:

References 

*" 'Horror frog' breaks own bones to produce claws." NewScientist.com, 2008

Further information
ADW: Arthroleptidae: Information
 

 
Afrobatrachia
Amphibian families
Taxa named by St. George Jackson Mivart
Afrotropical realm fauna